Kortney Jamaal Pollard (born January 12, 1988), who performs under the stage name Mali Music, is a Grammy Award-winning American recording artist, singer-songwriter and producer. His two independently released albums, The Coming (2008) and The 2econd Coming (2009), earned him much critical and underground acclaim. In 2011, he was the first inspirational artist to be a part of BET's acclaimed "Music Matters" series. Signed to RCA Records in 2013, Mali released the single "Beautiful" in anticipation of his first major album release Mali Is..., which was released on June 17, 2014 and earned a Grammy nomination for Best Urban Contemporary Album.

Career
Pollard was born in Phoenix, Arizona. He learned to play the piano at age 5 and at age 11 was active in the ministry of music in his church. In 2011, he signed a short-lived contract with Akon's label Konvict Muzik.

The 2econd Coming was released on October 20, 2009, Ready Aim & Beautiful on February 26, 2013 and Mali Is... on June 17, 2014.

Discography

Studio albums

Awards and nominations

References

External links
 

Living people
1988 births
African-American male singer-songwriters
American gospel singers
American contemporary R&B singers
Performers of Christian contemporary R&B music
Musicians from Phoenix, Arizona
RCA Records artists
21st-century African-American male singers
Singer-songwriters from Arizona